Slatina pri Ponikvi is a dispersed settlement in the hills north of Ponikva in the Municipality of Šentjur, eastern Slovenia. The settlement, and the entire municipality, are included in the Savinja Statistical Region, which is in the Slovenian portion of the historical Duchy of Styria.

Name
The name of the settlement was changed from Slatina to Slatina pri Ponikvi in 1953.

References

External links
Slatina pri Ponikvi at Geopedia

Populated places in the Municipality of Šentjur